Plenty Valley Highway is a  highway with a mix of two arterial roads in northern Melbourne, Australia.

Otherwise Known As 

There are two street names which exceed the Plenty Valley Highway status which includes:

Plenty Road (from Metropolitan Ring Road, Bundoora to Albert Street, Reservoir)
Albert Street (from Plenty Road, Reservoir to Bell Street, Preston)

See also 

 List of Melbourne highways

Highways and freeways in Melbourne
Transport in the City of Banyule
Transport in the City of Darebin
Transport in the City of Whittlesea